Amod may refer to:

Amod (SugandhPur), a town in the Bharuch district, Gujarat, India
Amod Field (born 1967), American football player
Sheraan Amod (b. 1985), a South African internet entrepreneur
Amod, Gujarat, a town and capital of a taluka in Bharuch district, Gujarat, India
Amod (newspaper), a major weekly newspaper published in Bangladesh